Brendan Radford (fl. 2000s) is a vocalist and guitarist who has performed and recorded with many leading Australian and international artists. He was part of Lee Kernaghan’s touring band for over ten years and has also been in the Country Music Awards of Australia house band for the past six years. Prior to and also during this period he has performed and recorded with other Australian and International artists including Pam Tillis, Gina Jeffreys, Troy Cassar-Daley, Adam Harvey, Sara Storer, Glenn Shorrock,  and Russell Morris

Brendan operates his own recording facility RADMUSIC and has been busy producing musical projects and albums for a number of local and interstate artists. These include award winning productions for Casey Watt, Rose Carleo and Lance Friend that have consistently achieved Top 30 in the country music charts.

Over the past two years Brendan has been progressively recording a solo album, made up largely of his own material. The first single, ‘Sweet Maree’ was released to radio in March 2009.

‘Snow’ is the second single release and title track from Brendan's first solo effort. The album features 12 tracks and includes a number of other songs written by Brendan, along with interesting reworks of a few obscure classics. The album also contains two instrumental tracks. Brendan produced all tracks, features on vocals, guitars, harmonica and mandolin, and is joined by some of Australia's premier musicians, including James Gillard, Mitch Farmer, Jake Lardot, Hugh Curtis, Vaughan Jones, Michel Rose, Mick Albeck, Rose Carleo and a duet with Casey Watt.

Brendan is up for awards in four of the seven categories including best Male Vocalist, Bush Ballad/Heritage, Instrumental and Vocal Collaboration at the Queensland Country Music Awards.

References

Queensland Country Music Awards finalists announced
Brendan Radford - Queensland Country Music Awards Finalists Announced
Brendan Radford - Snow
98.9FM's All Australian Top 20 Country Countdown

Living people
Australian musicians
Year of birth missing (living people)